Incoboto is an iOS puzzle video game developed by Oakland, California-based indie studio Fluttermind and released on March 1, 2012.

Critical reception 

The game has a Metacritic score of 85/100 based on 9 critic reviews.

References

External links 

2012 video games
Adventure games
IOS games
IOS-only games
Puzzle video games
Video games developed in the United States